Roy Carl Carlson (May 4, 1937 – April 11, 2011) was an American educator and politician.

Born in Minneapolis, Minnesota, he graduated from Robbinsdale High School, in Robbinsdale, Minnesota, and served in the United States Army. He went to Minneapolis Vocational School where he learned carpentry and was an apprentice. Carlson received his bachelor's and master's degrees in industrial education from University of Wisconsin–Stout in 1968 and taught industrial education in high school. He also went to Bethel University. He served in the Minnesota House of Representatives as a Democrat in 1975 from Pine City, Minnesota.

Notes

1937 births
2011 deaths
Politicians from Minneapolis
People from Pine City, Minnesota
Military personnel from Minnesota
University of Wisconsin–Stout alumni
Bethel University (Minnesota) alumni
Democratic Party members of the Minnesota House of Representatives